Gunsmoke in Tucson is a 1958 American CinemaScope Western film directed by Thomas Carr and written by Paul Leslie Peil and Robert L. Joseph. The film stars Mark Stevens, Forrest Tucker, Gale Robbins, Vaughn Taylor, John Ward and Kevin Hagen. The film was released on December 7, 1958, by Allied Artists Pictures.

Plot
Two brothers on opposite sides of the law become embroiled in an Arizona range war between cattlemen and farmers. As young men, the two brothers are forced to watch their supposed horse thief father hung by a posse. After the hanging the two are run out of town and told not to return.

The older brother, John Brazos, becomes an Arizona Territory Marshal and the younger brother, Chip, becomes an outlaw.

Cast           
 Mark Stevens as Jedediah 'Chip' Coburn
 Forrest Tucker as John Brazos
 Gale Robbins as Lou Crenshaw
 Vaughn Taylor as Ben Bodeen
 John Ward as Slick Kirby
 Kevin Hagen as Clem Haney
 John Cliff as Sheriff Cass
 Gail Kobe as Katy Porter
 George Keymas as Hondo
 Richard Reeves as Notches Pole
 William Henry as Sheriff Will Blane (as Bill Henry)

References

External links
 

1958 films
American Western (genre) films
1958 Western (genre) films
Allied Artists films
CinemaScope films
Films directed by Thomas Carr
1950s English-language films
1950s American films